Climacograptidae is an extinct family of graptolites.

Genera
List of genera from Maletz (2014):

†Appendispinograptus Li & Li, 1985
†Clathrograptus Lapworth, 1873
†Climacograptus Hall, 1865
†Diplacanthograptus Mitchell, 1987
†Euclimacograptus Riva, 1989 in Riva & Ketner (1989)
†Gymnograptus Bulman, 1953
†Haddingograptus Maletz, 1997
†Idiograptus Lapworth, 1880
†Leptothecalograptus Li, 2002 in Mu et al. (2002)
†Mendograptus Rusconi 1948
†Notograptus Rusconi 1948
†Oelandograptus Mitchell, 1987
†Proclimacograptus Maletz, 1997
†Prolasiograptus Lee, 1963
†Pseudoclimacograptus Přibyl, 1947
†Reteograptus Hall, 1859 (= Retiograptus Hall, 1865)
†Styracograptus Štorch et al., 2011
†Undulograptus Bouček, 1973

References

Graptolites
Prehistoric hemichordate families